Maciej Maciejewski (1 October 1914 – 17 May 2018) was a Polish screen and stage actor.

Personal life
Maciej Maciejewski was born in Augustów. He made his debut in 1938 in Halka. He was employed at the Polish Theatre in Warsaw. Maciejewski turned 100 in October 2014. Maciejewski died in Warsaw in May 2018 at the age of 103.

Filmography
 1951: Youth of Chopin
 1953: Żołnierz zwycięstwa
 1954: Pod gwiazdą frygijską
 1955: Podhale w ogniu
 1957: Kanał
 1957: The Real End of the Great War
 1960: Rzeczywistość
 1970: Epilog norymberski
 1984: Polonia Restituta
 1988: A Short Film About Killing
 1998: Klan
 2000: Egoiści
 2002: Samo życie

Polish dubbing 
 1959: 12 Angry Men as Juror #6
 1971: Elizabeth R as Gardiner
 1986: Peter the Great as Patriarch Adrian of Moscow

See also
 List of centenarians (actors, filmmakers and entertainers)

References

External links

Maciej Maciejewski at the Filmpolski.pl (in Polish).

1914 births
2018 deaths
20th-century Polish male actors
Polish centenarians
Polish male film actors
Polish male stage actors
Men centenarians
People from Augustów